St Leonard's Church, Shirland is a Grade II* listed parish church in the Church of England in Shirland, Derbyshire.

History
The church dates from the 15th century. Alterations were made in the 17th century. It was restored between 1848 and 1849 under the direction of the architect Henry Isaac Stevens and was re-opened by the Bishop of Lichfield on 24 January 1849.

The church was restored again in 1929.

Parish status
The church is in a joint parish with:
Holy Cross Church, Morton
St Peter's Church, Stonebroom

Organ
An organ was installed at a cost of £200 in 1885 by John Stringer and Co of Hanley. A specification of the organ can be found on the National Pipe Organ Register.

Bells
The church tower contains a ring of 6 bells.

See also
Grade II* listed buildings in North East Derbyshire
Listed buildings in Shirland and Higham

References

Shirland
Shirland